Berline may refer to:
Berline (airline), a former German airline (1991-1994)
the French name for Sedan (automobile)
alternative spelling of Berlin (carriage), from which the previous was derived
Nicole Berline, a mathematician